Takkar is a 1995 Indian Hindi-language romantic thriller film directed by Bharat Rangachary, starring Sunil Shetty and Naseeruddin Shah as a psychopathic Police inspector . The film was released on 14 July 1995 and did only average business. It is 29th highest grossing Bollywood film of 1995.

Plot
Takkar revolves around the lives of three characters — Ravi Malhotra (Sunil Shetty), Mohini (Sonali Bendre) and Inspector D'Costa (Naseeruddin Shah). Ravi is a freelance photographer, in love with Mohini, who works hard to make a living so they can be together. Inspector D'Costa is an efficient but corrupt cop who takes advantage of criminals by helping them in return for money and then double crossing them; he pretends to be on the side of the law. No one is considered strong or wise enough to confront D'costa.

D'Costa one day notices Ravi and Mohini on the beach, and he immediately falls for her. To keep Ravi away from her, he frames Ravi on the day before his marriage to Mohini by falsely implicating him in a drug deal case in a fake raid. Ravi is sentenced to four years of imprisonment. In prison, Ravi decides to study the law so he can fight injustice. He is helped by prisoners like Kaku (Rakesh Bedi) who are in jail because of D'Costa and want him dead.

In Ravi's absence, D'Costa befriends Mohini. She begins to like and respect him as though he were a good man. After two years, Ravi is released from jail because of good behavior and on efforts by DCP Mishra (Shafi Inamdar) made on Mohini's pleas. Soon Ravi and Mohini are married. D'Costa learns about Ravi's release from prison and his marriage. Infuriated, he harasses the couple repeatedly to get close to Mohini. But Mohini never gives in to D'Costa's moves. Ravi soon learns that it was D'Costa who had framed him on the day before his marriage, and he decides to take revenge. He follows D'Costa closely, watching all his activities. Being a photographer, he captures the cop on camera.

DCP Mishra  is killed by D'Costa when both of them rescue a group of school children from terrorists holding them captive in a school. This is noted by Ravi, and he makes it known publicly. D'Costa tries to eliminate Ravi but in vain. Soon an enquiry is arranged by the police (on Ravi's request), and Ravi plays the prosecution lawyer. Ravi traps D'Costa in his own words, making him confess to his crime. He also provides evidence for the same.

The helpless D'Costa is now suspended from service. His mistress Lily (Archana Puran Singh) tells the couple that he will never leave them in peace, but informs them that his own desires can be used against him. Based on a plan. Ravi leaves the house, pretending to go out of the city. D'Costa learns of this and immediately goes to the couple's house, where he is met by a surprise reception. Mohini dances with him, pretends to seduce him when abruptly Ravi breaks in. He beats up D'Costa, police arrive and arrest the former cop.

D'Costa is now jailed. But enemies are not at bay for him. In prison, he comes across the men whom he had once jailed, working in the jail compound. The criminals together attack and kill D'Costa.

The film ends with D'Costa's burial, as Ravi sticks a cross with D'Costa's name on the grave. He then says 'Everything has come to an end for good' and walks away with Mohini, as the prisoners look on and the credits begin to roll.

Cast
Suniel Shetty as Ravi Malhotra
Sonali Bendre as Mohini
Naseeruddin Shah as Inspector D'Costa
Shafi Inamdar as DCP Mishra
Kunika as Sheena Vasudev, News Editor
Archana Puran Singh as Maya, D'Costa's mistress.
Himani Shivpuri as Mohini's mother
Tiku Talsania as Mamaji
Ajit Vachani as Sikandar Bakht
Sudhir Dalvi as Commissioner of Police
Sameer Khakhar as Police Constable
Rakesh Bedi as Prisoner Kaku
Pramod Moutho as Prisoner with Yellow Robe.
Mohan Joshi as Raja Thakur
Ishrat Ali as Kale Sarkar

Track listing
Lyrics: Rahat Indori, Nawab Arzoo, Maya Govind, Dev Kohli & Rani Malik
Singers: Kumar Sanu, Abhijeet Bhattacharya, Alka Yagnik, Alisha Chinoy & Sapna Mukherjee
Music: Anu Malik

References

External links
 

Indian romantic thriller films
1990s romantic thriller films
1990s Hindi-language films
1990 films
1995 crime thriller films
1995 films
Indian crime thriller films
Films scored by Anu Malik
Films directed by Bharat Rangachary